Live Phish Vol. 5 was recorded live at Alpine Valley in East Troy, Wisconsin, a small town that is located  Southwest of Milwaukee, Wisconsin, on July 8, 2000.

At the time of its release, the album received a mixed reaction from fans, as it seemed to be a rather standard Phish concert compared to other shows from the band's 2000 summer tour. Moreover, the band was known for playing a special setlist of songs at Alpine Valley, ranging from rare covers and first-time performances.

Regardless of the somewhat basic setlist, the band embarks on several improvisational flights, including the 15-minute "Piper" and an extended, bluesy solo from Trey Anastasio on an 11-minute version of Jeff Holdsworth's "Possum".

Three months later, the band would take an indefinite hiatus from recording and touring. They returned for a New Year's Eve performance in 2002 at Madison Square Garden (NY, NY), MSG being their home venue for past and present NYE throwdowns.

Track listing

Disc one
Set one:
"Punch You in the Eye" (Anastasio) - 8:53
"NICU" (Anastasio, Marshall) - 5:28
"My Soul" (Chenier) - 7:43
"Poor Heart" (Gordon) - 2:57
"Wolfman's Brother" (Anastasio, Fishman, Gordon, Marshall, McConnell) - 9:50
"First Tube" (Anastasio, Lawton, Markellis) - 8:14
"Llama" (Anastasio) - 5:21
"Guyute" (Anastasio, Marshall) - 10:30
"Run Like an Antelope" (Anastasio, Marshall, Pollak) - 13:48

Disc two
Set two:
"Heavy Things" (Anastasio, Herman, Marshall) - 5:36
"Piper" (Anastasio, Marshall) - 14:49
"Rock & Roll" (Reed) - 7:08
"Tweezer" (Anastasio, Fishman, Gordon, McConnell) - 11:42
"Walk Away" (Walsh) - 3:48

Disc three
Set two, continued:
"Twist" (Anastasio, Marshall) - 9:53
"The Horse" (Anastasio, Marshall) - 0:48
"Silent in the Morning" (Anastasio, Marshall) - 5:11
"Possum" (Holdsworth) - 11:06
Encore:
"Suzy Greenberg" (Anastasio, Pollak) - 5:04
"Tweezer Reprise" (Anastasio, Fishman, Gordon, McConnell) - 4:28

Personnel
 Trey Anastasio - guitars, lead vocals
 Page McConnell - piano, organ, backing vocals, lead vocals on "Rock & Roll", "Walk Away" and "Silent in the Morning"
 Mike Gordon - bass, backing vocals, lead vocals on "Poor Heart" and "Possum"
 Jon Fishman - drums, backing vocals

References

05
2001 live albums
Elektra Records live albums